Cedar Run is a stream in St. Francois County in the U.S. state of Missouri. It is a tributary of the Big River.

Cedar Run was so named on account of cedar trees near its course.

See also
List of rivers of Missouri

References

Rivers of St. Francois County, Missouri
Rivers of Missouri